Qarah Mosali (also Romanized as Qarah Moşalī, Qareh Moşallá, Qarah Moşallá, and Gareh Mosalla) is a village in Howmeh Rural District, in the Central District of Maneh and Samalqan County, North Khorasan Province, Iran. At the 2006 census, its population was 1,288, in 321 families.

References 

Populated places in Maneh and Samalqan County